Thomas Poole or Powle was the member of Parliament for the constituency of Cirencester for the parliaments of 1571 and 1572.

References 

English MPs 1571
Members of Parliament for Cirencester
English MPs 1572–1583